The 2014 Amputee Football World Cup, aka 2014 Amputee Soccer World Cup, was the 14th edition of the biannual international competition of amputee football national men's teams. It was organized by the World Amputee Football Federation (WAFF), and was held in Culiacán, Mexico between November 30–December 8, 2014. The previous event took place in Russia in 2012.

Russia won the title for the seventh time, defeating Angola in the final. Turkey became a bronze medalist before Poland.

Participating nations
Following 23 nations, including Uzbekistan as the defending world champion, competed in six groups while two nations Georgia did not show,  Iran withdrew and Ghana arrived late. The first three ranking teams in each group qualified for the knockout stage of 16 while the last ranking teams, four in total, played "Copa Culiacan" to determine the places 17-20.

† Did not play

Preliminary round

Group A

Group B

Group C

Group D

Group E

Group F

Copa Culiacan

Knockout stage

Round of 16

Quarterfinals

Semifinals

Bronze medal match

Gold medal match

Rankings

References

Amputee Football World Cup
International association football competitions hosted by Mexico
Amputee Football World Cup
Amputee
2014 in disability sport